Palo is a municipality in the province of Huesca, Spain. As of 2018, it has a population of 27 inhabitants.

Main sights 
 Church of San Martín
 Church of Santa Calmosa
 Hermitage of San Clemente

External links 

Municipalities in the Province of Huesca